Róisín, sometimes anglicized as Roisin or Rosheen, is an Irish female given name, meaning "little rose". The English equivalent is Rose, Rosaleen or Rosie.

People

Roisin Conaty, English comedian
Roisin Dunne, guitarist in the group 7 Year Bitch
Róisín Egenton (born 1977), winner of the 2000 Rose of Tralee
Róisín Ingle (born 1971), Irish Times columnist, editor and "podcaster"
Róisín McAliskey (born 1971), Irish political activist
Roisin McAuley, TV reporter and author
Roisin McGettigan (born 1980), Irish athlete
Róisín McLaren, Scottish political activist
Róisín Murphy (born 1973), Irish singer/songwriter
Róisín O (born 1988), Irish singer/songwriter
Róisín Shortall (born 1954), Irish politician
 Róisín Upton (born 1994) is an Ireland field hockey international.

Literature
Róisín Dubh is a personification of Ireland. It features in a song of the range name, which was translated into English as the nationalistic poem "Dark Rosaleen" by James Clarence Mangan.

Music
"Róisín Dubh" is a 16th-century Irish song translated into English by Pádraig Pearse.
The Róisín Dubh is a renowned music venue in Galway.
The Thin Lizzy Album Black Rose: A Rock Legend references Róisín Dubh in both title and the final track.

See also
Roisin (disambiguation)
Rosine (given name)

References

Irish feminine given names
Irish-language feminine given names